Hometown Cha-Cha-Cha is a 2021 South Korean television series starring Shin Min-a, Kim Seon-ho and Lee Sang-yi. It is a remake of 2004 South Korean film Mr. Handy, Mr. Hong. It aired from August 28 to October 17, 2021, on tvN's Saturdays and Sundays at 21:00 (KST) time slot. It is also available for streaming on Netflix.

The series was a commercial hit and became one of the highest-rated series on cable television history. It ranked first place during its entire run for eight weeks, and the last episode achieved 12.665% nationwide rating, with over 3.2 milion views. It also became one of Netflix's most-watched non-English television shows, and one of its longest-running hits as it spent 16 weeks in global top ten rankings.

Premise

Yoon Hye-jin, an accomplished dentist from Seoul, goes to the idyllic seaside village of Gongjin on her late mother's birthday after her life goes awry. She spontaneously decides to open up a dental clinic, and gets to know jack-of-all-trades Hong Du-sik, also known as Chief Hong. The drama depicts tiki-taka romance between the two and life of other Gongjin's residents.

Cast

Main
 Shin Min-a as Yoon Hye-jin, a perfectionist and pragmatic dentist who ends up moving to Gongjin after her life goes awry.
 Shim Hye-yeon as child Yoon Hye-jin
 Oh Ye-joo as teenage Yoon Hye-jin
 Kim Seon-ho as Hong Du-sik, Gongjin's handyman who is known as Chief Hong around the village. He is unemployed officially, but is always busy giving a helping hand to everyone. He is good at everything and appears to assist whatever random tasks his neighbors need help with.
  as child Hong Du-sik
 An Seong-won as young teenage Hong Du-sik
 Moon Seong-hyun as teenage Hong Du-sik
 Lee Sang-yi as Ji Seong-hyun, a star variety show production director who is workaholic and has a bright personality.

Supporting

People around Hye-jin
 Gong Min-jeung as Pyo Mi-seon, Hye-jin's best friend who is a dental hygienist.
 Seo Sang-won as Yoon Tae-hwa, Hye-jin's father.
 Woo Mi-hwa as Lee Myung-shin, Hye-jin's stepmother.

People around Seong-hyun
 Park Ye-young as Wang Ji-won, a veteran writer who has been working with Seong-hyun for seven years.
 Lee Suk-hyeong as Kim Do-ha, an assistant director who struggles to find a work-life balance in his busy filming schedule because of his workaholic senior, Seong-hyun.
 Seong Tae as June, main rapper of idol group DOS.
 Baek Seung as In-woo, sub-vocalist of DOS.

People in Gongjin
 Kim Young-ok as Kim Gam-ri, leader of the grandmothers in Gongjin.
  as Lee Mat-yi, the second of the three grandmothers.
 Shin Shin-ae as Park Sook-ja, the youngest of the three grandmothers.
 Jo Han-chul as Oh Cheon-jae, the owner of Gongjin's live café and pub. He is a former singer with stage name Oh Yoon, who disappeared after releasing a hit song in the 1990s.
 Lee Bong-ryun as Yeo Hwa-jung, Young-guk's ex-wife who was born and raised in Gongjin. She is the building owner of Hye-jin's dental clinic and house.
 In Gyo-jin as Jang Young-guk, Hwa-jung's ex-husband. He is the youngest district head who used to be a seventh grade civil servant.
 Hong Ji-hee as Yoo Cho-hee, a teacher at Cheongjin Elementary School.
 Cha Chung-hwa as Jo Nam-sook, president of Prosperous Gongjin Department Store and owner of a Chinese restaurant near Hye-jin's dental clinic.
 Yoon Seok-hyun as Choi Geum-chul, Eun-chul's brother and Du-sik's friend who is the owner of a hardware store.
 Kim Joo-yeon as Ham Yun-kyung, Geum-chul's wife who owns a convenience store.
 Kang Hyung-seok as Choi Eun-chul, Geum-chul's brother and a police officer who is a sincere person and works hard on everything he does.
 Kim Sung-bum as Ban Yong-hun, Gongjin's community center manager.
 Kim Min-seo as Oh Ju-ri, Cheon-jae's daughter.
 Ki Eun-yoo as Jang Yi-jun, Young-guk and Hwa-jung's son.
 Go Do-yeon as Choi Bo-ra, Geum-chul and Yun-kyung's daughter.

Special appearances
 Lee Jung-eun as Hye-jin's patient
 Bae Hae-sun as the head doctor at Hye-jin's former dental clinic
 Lee Jin-hee as Hye-jin's mother
 Lee Ho-jae as Du-sik's grandfather
  as Myung-hak, a patient at Hye-jin's dental clinic.
  as Lee Kang-wook, Hye-jin's ex-boyfriend and Seong-hyeon's high school classmate (Episode 5th and 9th).
 Kim Dae-gon as rottiserie chicken seller.
 Kim Ji-hyun as Seon-ah, Seong-hyun's cousin and Jung-woo's wife.
 Oh Eui-shik as Park Jung-woo, Du-sik's friend whom he met during college days.
 Lee Do-yeop as Gam-ri's son
  as a customer at Nam-sook's restaurant.
 Jo Young-seo as main dancer of DOS.
 Kim Do-kyun as lead dancer of DOS.

Episodes 
Hometown Cha-Cha-Cha's episode titles were written in official wallpaper of each episode in the drama official website.

Production

Development 
The series, written by Shin Ha-eun, was her comeback after co-writing the 2019 drama The Crowned Clown. It was first announced on December 21, 2020 under the working title of Hong Ban-jang. The series is a drama remake of the 2004 movie .

Casting 
Casting was first announced on December 21, 2020, with Kim Seon-ho and Shin Min-a being offered the lead roles. In April 2, 2021, it was officially announced that Yoo Je-won will be directing the drama literally translated as Seaside Village Cha-Cha-Cha (갯마을 차차차). In the same time, Kim Seon-ho and Shin Min-a were confirmed as main leads, also Lee Sang-yi was being offered the role. The drama marked Director Yoo Je-won second collaboration with Shin Min-a after both worked on Tomorrow with You (2017).

Filming 
The first script reading of the cast was held on April 21, 2021. Filming was scheduled to begin on May 8, which was conducted mainly in Pohang. The drama scheduled to wrapped up filming on October 6th, 2021.

Music and choreography 
The series features numerous song covers sung onscreen by the characters. Lim Ha-young, the music director, was responsible for selecting all of the songs used. However writer Shin Ha-eun, director Yoo Je-won, actors and crews also actively gave ideas. Just like Hong Du-sik from the original film, Kim Seon-ho had to sing and play guitar in the drama. In drama version, Du-sik covered "Old Love" from Lee Moon-sae, different song from the original film. 

Other drama characters performed in Gongjin Village's "Lighthouse Song Festival". The opening stage of the festival was performance of Gongjin's pride, Oh Yeon, who sung his only hit song, "Exercising in the Moonlight". To revive realistic festival atmosphere, Jo Han-chul sang and played the guitar live. "Exercising in the Moonlight" is actually an old song composed by Lim back in the nineties, selected to achieve realistic nineties sound of hit song that ranked second place in the 1993 K-pop Top 10 Gayo, best achievement of the nineties singer, Oh Yeon. According to the production team, the festival was the most important scene in the sixth episode. It was the most difficult scene that took a long time to film due to involvement the largest number of people, uncertain weather during the rainy season, whilst following the quarantine rules because of COVID-19 situation.

This drama featured a fictional idol group DOS with their hit song "Just a Feeling". Dance for the song was choreographed by Jo Young-seo and Kim Do-gyun, choreographer and dancer from group named Dance of Soul (DOS), known as choreographers for hit television show, Mr. Trot.  Jo mentioned that the idol group name in the drama was originally "Choice," however writer Shin Ha-eun changed the name into DOS. Jo and Kim also said that their appearance in the drama was a sudden decision. When they created the choreography, they were invited to act as idols in the drama. Seong Tae, Baek Seung, Jo Young-seo, Kim Do-gyun and one other member from the dance team then went through a month dance practice in order to potray image of DOS perfectly. The dance were performed by at "Lighthouse Song Festival", first by Hye-jin and Du-sik who acted as backup dancers for Oh Ju-ri, then by idol group DOS who do surprise performance at the festival.

Media

Original soundtrack 
Hometown Cha-Cha-Cha soundtrack album written by music director Lim Ha-young contains 11 songs (including singles) and 32 score pieces from the series. It features vocal performances from Car, the Garden, Kassy, Cheeze, Choi Yu-ree, Kim Jae-hwan, Sandeul, Seungmin (Stray Kids), and Lee Sang-yi. This sound source compilation consists of a total of 43 tracks. Along with the 8 previously released OST songs, "Just a Feeling" of fictonal idol group 'DOS' in the drama, which was requested by viewers a lot, and two songs 'Oh Yoon', the superstar of 'Gongjin' played by actor Jo Han-chul, "Exercise at the Moonlit Night" and "End and Beginning" were added to the album. A total of 11 songs were recorded, and 32 carefully selected score tracks were included to fully feel the emotion of Hometown Cha-Cha-Cha and the afterglow of the drama. It is expected to be a surprise gift for fans who are missing the song.

On July 18, 2022, Hometown Cha-Cha-Cha soundtrack album also released in LP version. It was ranked 9 in the Circle Chart Retail Album Chart on July 19th, 2022 with 891 copies sold.

Part 1

Part 2

Part 3

Part 4

Part 5

Part 6

Part 7

Part 8

Chart performance

Tie-in publishing 
The series' original script was published into two books; each covers eight episodes. The official release date was scheduled on early November 2021.

On November 30, 2021, Hometown Cha-Cha-Cha Photo Essay was scheduled to be published, but was canceled due unfortunate circumstances. However, on October 17, 2022, publication of the photo essay was finally confirmed. Photo essay was published in a package of two books; each covers eight episodes on February 2023.

Reception

Big Data Reception 
During its airing, Hometown Cha-Cha-Cha managed to enter Top Ten in Content Power Index (CPI) powered by RACOI. It was first entered Top 10 (Rank 6th) in drama category in the 4th week of August (from 23rd to 29th). In first and second week of September, the drama rank 3rd place drama category and 4th in overall category. In third week of September, the drama rank 2nd place in the drama category and 3rd in the overall category. For four weeks in a row, from 4th week of September 2021 to 2nd week of October 2021, Hometown Cha-Cha-Cha was ranked 1st in drama category. For overall category, in 4th and 5th week of September the drama rank 2nd. After slight drop in 1st week of October to 4th place in overall category, the drama was back to 2nd rank in 2nd week of October.

Hometown Cha-Cha-Cha also generated buzz according to Good Data Corporation. It was charting in Top 10 in TV Topicality Ranking in drama division category since 3rd week of August 2021 to 2nd week of October 2021. In 3rd week of August 2021, Hometown Cha-Cha-Cha ranked 8th. In 4th week of August 2021, 1st week and 2nd week of September, the drama secured the third rank. It climbed to 2nd rank in 3rd week week of September, 2021. Hometown Cha-Cha-Cha finally, won the top spot in drama popularity in the 4th week of September and 1st week of October 2021. The main leads, Kim Seon-ho and Shin Min-a ranked 1st and 2nd in consecutive weeks from 3rd week of August 2021 to the 4th week of September. In the 5th week of September, Kim Seon-ho ranked 2nd and Shin Min-a 3rd. On the 1st and 2nd week of October 2021, Kim Seon-ho back to rank first in the 1st and 2nd week of October 2021. Meanwhile, Shin Min-a in the 1st week of October 2021, ranked 5th. She was back to rank 3rd in 2nd week of October 2021.

Hometown Cha-Cha-Cha also enter top 20 of 'FUNdex' (rank 17th) which recorded 83.13 points out of 355 Korean dramas aired from 2018 to 2021. 'FUNdex' provides fun and box office predictions of content by integrating six data: the number of household viewers, the number of 2049 viewers, topicality, performer topicality, clip views, and media attention. Good Data Corporation data and public data provided by RACOI were also used.

On April 18, 2022, the result of The 2021 Big Data Utilization Hallyu Market Research was announced. The report was published by the Ministry of Culture, Sports and Tourism and The Korean Foundation for International Cultural Exchange  (KOFICE). Topic of this report is about the public interest in the Korean Wave. It analyzed the current status of Korean Wave by collecting and analyzing voluntary global reactions that occur online in real-time. Hometown Cha-Cha-Cha, along with its leads, Kim Seonho and Shin Min-a were included in the most searched (prominent keywords) related to K-drama on the report.

Drama popularity also had direct impact to main leads brand reputation. According of big data analysis by The Korea Corporate Reputation Research Institute, in September 2021, Kim Seon-ho topped the drama actor brand reputation and Shin Min-a was listed in third position. The institute analyzed 99,640,608 brand big data of 50 actors appearing in dramas aired from August 20, 2021 to September 20, 2021 as consumers' brand participation, media volume, traffic volume, and communication volume. It was measured and indexed with a brand reputation algorithm. Compared to the drama actor brand big data in August 2021, it increased by 21.00%.

A year-end poll that Gallup conducted in South Korea named Kim Seon-ho as Gallup Korea's Television Actor of the Year, while Shin Min-a was listed in second position.

Commercial performance 
Hometown Cha-Cha-Cha commercial success had impact to its production house commercial performance. The proportion of sales was 55.9%, an increase of 8.1% compared to the same period last year. GTist, who participated in the production company of the drama Hometown Cha-Cha-Cha, is considered to have made a full profit in 2021 (net profit of ). Compared to the third quarter of 2020, sales increased by 7.4% and operating profit by 23.6%. TV advertisements and content sales increased by 22.9% and 33.3%, respectively, compared to the same period in 2020. This was attributed to sales of major dramas including Hometown Cha-Cha-Cha.

Popularity of the drama coined the term “Gaetcha Craze”. Properties featured in the drama saw an increase in sales. The wine that Yoon Hye-jin gifted to Hong Du-sik in episodes 5, got a rush of orders and was temporarily sold out. The bag worn by Yoon Hye-jin also sold out. In addition, inquiries about other clothes, jewelry, and shoes Shin wore are flooding in. Yoon Hye-jin’s fashion was gaining popularity due to mixed of sophisticated fashion with her unique and lovely charm.

Kim Haeng-sook’ poetry book, Portrait of Echo, gained renewed attention after one of the poem The Gatekeeper was featured in the drama. It has never been on the bestseller list since it was released in 2014, but thanks to Hometown Cha-Cha-Cha, it was rediscovered by the public after 7 years. It rose to the second bestseller list in the Kyobo Bookstore's poetry section in the first week of October. It also entered the 3rd bestseller list in the Yes 24 Korean poetry category as of the second week of October. Korean translation book of Henry David Thoreau's Walden, which Hong Ban-jang read in episode 2, was ranking 11th on the bestseller list in the Yes 24 essay category as of the second week of October. As a result of analyzing the book sales growth rate for one week before and after Walden and Portrait of Echo, starting with the exposure date of Hometown Cha-Cha-Cha, Yes24 showed high sales growth rates of 369% and 3,257%, respectively.

Yes24 reported, that the limited first editions (the writer's edition) of unedited scriptbook Hometown Cha-Cha-Cha 1 and Hometown Cha-Cha-Cha 2, which contain autographs and messages from writer Shin Ha-eun, actors Shin Min-a and Kim Seon-ho, reached the top of the overall bestseller list within one day of pre-sale, and over 9,000 copies were booked on the day of publication alone and proved its popularity. As for the purchasing age of the script book, people in their 20s (36.8%) and 30s (32.4%) had the highest share, followed by people in their 40s (18.7%) and teenagers (7.4%). The male to female ratio was approximately 1:9. According to the official from Aladin, the script soared to the number one spot on Aladin’s bestsellers list on October 16, 2021. “We have been selling the scripts of popular dramas, but a drama script topping the bestseller list is rare,” an Aladin official told The Korea Herald.

Critical Performance 
Hometown Cha-Cha-Cha largely received positive critical feedback, primarily for its simplicity, acting by the cast, beautiful cinematography and setting, and warm and healing vibe. Variety selected Hometown Cha-Cha-Cha as one of "The Best International TV Shows of 2021". At rank sixth, the story’s simplicity and lightheartedness has a refreshing vibe amid the doom and gloom of the pandemic. On 21st December 2021 NME unveiled "The Best Kdrama of 2021", in which the series was ranked eighth. According to them, the show won viewers over with its upfront and straightforward approach in dealing with different dilemmas, without being overly preachy and tacky. Every episode is like a warm embrace from those once-strangers-turned-family, offering comfort and respite whether you’re experiencing the highs or lows of every day. Graham Falk of The Scotsman also included the series on the list of "Best K-drama TV shows on Netflix: The 10 most highly rated Korean dramas on Netflix.

Jan Lee of The Straits Times gave the drama a rating of 4/5 stars, pointing out three reasons to tune in to Hometown Cha-Cha-Cha were idyllic setting, charming leads and colourful supporting characters. Piere Conran from South China Morning Post gave the drama a rating of 3.5/5 stars and said that the hit romcom kept things simple and though it occasionally indulged in some hokey dramatics to strengthen its wafer-thin narrative, it was never in danger of alienating its committed audience, which was hooked to the last.”

S. Poorvaja from The Hindu said, “Ultimately, Hometown Cha-Cha-Cha is a good example of how K-dramas can get romance right, even as it attempts to provide more nuance and depth into the struggles of its lead characters. For everyone who has had their minds blown by Squid Game, this outing is a worthy representation of what else K-dramas excel at: slice-of-life goodness and wholesome romance of the best kind.” Carolyn Hinds from But Why Tho? A Geek Community, said, “Hometown Cha-Cha-Cha is a charming and sweet rom-com that’s the perfect palate cleanser if you’ve been watching a lot of heavy dramas and films recently.”

Professor Mo Jong-rin, a professor at Yonsei University Graduate School of International Studies praised the series as fresh. Professor Mo suggest that, "Netflix, the provider, may not have intended it, but the Squid Game and Hometown Cha-Cha-Cha are logically connected. The community of Hometown Cha-Cha-Cha is an alternative solution to the reality of the Squid Game. I'm sorry to the Squid Game fans, but I honestly want foreigners to remember Korea as a warm country that presented a community alternative to the problem, not a country that criticized reality in a provocative way.

Joel Keller of Decider gave a mixed review, "There’s enough good things about Hometown Cha-Cha-Cha, including the seashore scenery and the chemistry between the show’s leads, to recommend it. But it moves so slowly at times, the momentum comes close to grinding to a halt."

One of Pop Culture Critics, Jung Deok-hyeon of PD Journal described Hometown Cha-Cha-Cha as "Soft Healing Drama". Bang Yeon-joo, Pop Culture Critic from PD Journal was more mixed in the review, pointing towards some disappointing points, “The role of men and women did not deviate from the typical composition while portraying the difference in personality between Du-sik and Hye-jin in three dimensions. The episodes when “nosy” Du-sik appeared and saved Hye-jin whenever she was in crisis were a cliche setting that defined Hye-jin only as a "damsel in distress". Further more pointed out that the drama was a box office success despite its plain subject matter and genre. “This is because not only the romance between men and women in Gongjin, a seaside town, but also the story of the townsfolk's affectionate characters was built up one by one, bringing in calming fun.

Columnist Jung Deok-hyeon from Entermedia also shared the same sentiment. Particularly about scene of a house trespasser who appeared out of nowhere to advance the relationship between Yoon Hye-jin and Hong Du-sik as the weakness of the drama. Mentioned the cliché that may have been accepted in the past, were difficult to accept with the changed sensibilities of today. Despite these many weaknesses, the viewer response to was not bad, that’s because the fantasy drawn through the virtual space of Gongjin in this drama was that powerful. In a competitive reality like the die-and-kill Squid Game.

Tourism 
There was also an increase in visitors at the various filming sites of Hometown Cha-Cha-Cha. It contributed to a positive economic effect to Pohang tourism. The place in the drama quickly emerged as an essential course in Pohang tourism. It is said that the surrounding commercial district and the local economy have been revived thanks to the drama.

Popularity of the drama also contributed to Yangju tourism. Featured in the 12th episode of Hometown Cha-Cha-Cha was Chang Ucchin Museum of Art, founded in 2014 by The Chang Ucchin Foundation in collaboration with the city of Yangju. According to Yangju City, the unique structure of the white museum building and the harmony of the surrounding nature caught the viewers' attention, suggesting that more and more people are looking for information about the museum.

On November 24th, 2021 Hometown Cha-Cha-Cha contents was released through LG U+ XR platform U+DIVe. Studio Dragon used its premium IP to present virtual reality (VR) contents in partnership with Korea Tourism Organization and LG U+. This project started with the goal of promoting Korea' beautiful tourist destinations with drama content as a medium. All content was filmed in VR, and tourist places with unique emotions, were filmed in 3D 180-degree high-definition video to double the vividness. Lee Sang-yi reprised his role as Ji PD and became virtual guide of Gongjin VR tour.

Viewership

Television broadcast

Streaming television 
Following its release on Netflix, Hometown Cha-Cha-Cha became one of the platform's most-watched non-English television shows. According to FlixPatrol, a website providing global rankings for shows on Netflix, the series placed number 8 on its global chart. It remained on Netflix's most-watched non-English popular television show list for 16 weeks in global top ten rankings, and reached the top 10 charts in more than 20 countries.

It also remained on Netflix's Top 10 Chart for television shows for more than two months from its last episode.

Accolades

Awards and nominations

Listicles

See Also

 Mr. Handy, Mr. Hong

Notes

References

External links
  
 
 
 

2021 South Korean television series debuts
2021 South Korean television series endings
TVN (South Korean TV channel) television dramas
Television series by Studio Dragon
South Korean romantic comedy television series
Korean-language Netflix exclusive international distribution programming
Korean-language television shows
Serial drama television series
Television shows filmed in South Korea